Events in the year 1929 in Vatican City.

Incumbents 
 Sovereign Pontiff (Pope): Pope Pius XI
 Cardinal Secretary of State: Pietro Gasparri
 Governor of Vatican City: Camillo Serafini

Events

February–June 
 11 February
 The Lateran Treaty is signed by the Prime Minister and Head of Government of the Kingdom of Italy Benito Mussolini on behalf of King Victor Emmanuel III and by Cardinal Secretary of State Pietro Gasparri for Pope Pius XI.
 The Vatican lira is introduced as the nation's official currency on par with the Italian lira.
 13 February – The nation's postal system (Poste Vaticane) begins operations.
 30 May – SoS Cardinal Pietro Gasparri asks Pope Pius XI for his approval and for his signature on the of the Lateran Treaty.
 7 June – The Lateran treaty goes into full effect, establishing the independent state of Vatican City and reaffirming the special status of Catholic Christianity in Italy.

July–December 
 1 August – The first nationally printed postal stamps are produced and released under the authority of the Philatelic and Numismatic Office of the Vatican City State.
 16 December – Pope Pius XI appoints Manuel Gonçalves Cerejeira, Eugenio Pacelli, Luigi Lavitrano, Carlo Dalmazio Minoretti, Joseph Mac Rory, and Jean Verdier as cardinal priests.
 19 December – All six new cardinal priests from 16 December receive their red hats and title.

Deaths 
There is a very documented list of all of the people who have died in Vatican City, for being the smallest nation in the world and the head of the Catholic church. There were no deaths in the year 1929, and there would not be until the year 1961 with the death of Nicola Canali.

See also 

 Roman Catholic Church
 City states

External links 
 List of Aposcolic letters published by Pope Pius XI mainly in 1929 vatican.va

References 

 
Vatican City
Vatican City
1920s in Vatican City
Years of the 20th century in Vatican City